Articulated buses, popularly called "bendy buses," were introduced to London in October 2001 when two Wright Eclipse Fusion bodied Volvo B7LAs were hired from First Hampshire & Dorset, one of which was repainted into First London's red livery, and six Wright Fusion bodied Volvo B10LAs from First Glasgow for a trial on route 207 between Shepherd's Bush and Hayes-By-Pass.

In June 2002, new Mercedes-Benz Citaro O530Gs were introduced on Red Arrow services 507 and 521. While articulated bus operation had been standard in several other countries for over 20 years, their use in the United Kingdom had been limited with their introduction in London gaining a lot of press attention. They were later introduced on routes 12, 18, 25, 29, 38, 73, 149, 207, 436 and 453, which were among the busiest routes of the TfL bus network.

During the 2008 mayoral campaign, victorious Boris Johnson pledged to withdraw articulated buses on the grounds that they were unsuitable for London, and to introduce a modern version of the AEC Routemaster. Withdrawals began in July 2009, when articulated buses on routes 38, 507 and 521 were replaced with conventional single and double decker buses, and a prototype for the New Routemaster was promised to be on the streets by 2012. The last articulated buses were withdrawn in December 2011.

Background

Articulated buses were introduced on several high-capacity routes in the 2000s, coinciding with withdrawal from passenger service of the AEC Routemaster. The Routemasters, involving a step upwards and poor accessibility did not conform to the Disability Discrimination Act 1995. There was also the risk of litigation over accidents involving the Routemaster's rear open platform.

Articulated buses with multiple doors and simultaneous boarding arrangements were capable of loading passengers in less time than conventional double decker buses and Routemasters. They had a much higher passenger capacity, being able to carry over 140 people per vehicle compared to 77 in a Routemaster, although with far fewer seats.

Articulated buses took up more road space per vehicle (18 metres compared to 9.1 metres for a Routemaster and 10 metres for a double decker), although in terms of road surface used per passenger, there was little difference between double decker buses (which stack passengers vertically on two floors) and articulated buses – 11.8 cm road surface length per Routemaster passenger against 12.8 cm per articulated bus passenger: 8.7% more.

The increased vehicle size meant they were more likely to block junctions and cause difficulties for other road users. Press coverage regarding cyclists and motorcyclists was generally negative due to the reduced viewpoint of the driver and greater likelihood of cyclists to enter blind spots.

The routes converted to articulated bus operation were:

(1) Route 453 transferred from Selkent to London General on 16 February 2008 after tender renewal

Incidents

Fires
During the initial stages of deployment of the articulated buses, between December 2003 and March 2004 there were three similar fires on the new Mercedes-Benz Citaro buses, causing concern over the possibility of an in-built risk to the public. In one incident, a bus caught fire on its delivery route to its operator. The fires caused the temporary withdrawal and modification of the entire fleet of 130 buses.

The buses were brought back into service after engineers replaced and modified problematic pipework in the bus engines. A later fire was ruled out as unconnected. The problem resurfaced with ex Arriva London buses in Malta in August 2013.

Increased fare evasion
The introduction of articulated buses increased fare evasion as passengers were able to enter through any door, leading to the buses becoming known to Londoners as "The Free Bus". On other UK buses (including articulated buses outside London), entry is only permitted via the front entrance, which is monitored by the driver and thus discourages evasion. As a result, Transport for London recruited an extra 150 Revenue Protection Inspectors to police revenue collection. In 2006 it was reported that conventional buses (i.e. single and double-deckers) accounted for £3,636 of fare evasion in a year, compared to articulated vehicles at £6,333 per year.

Campaign issue
In September 2007, Boris Johnson, the Conservative Party candidate for the 2008 Mayor of London elections, said that his first act as mayor of London would be to "scrap" articulated buses and replace them with a "modern-day AEC Routemaster" with an open rear platform and a conductor. The New Routemaster first entered service in February 2012.

Withdrawal

In August 2008, following the election of Boris Johnson as Mayor of London, it was announced the articulated buses would be withdrawn as their five-year operating contracts expired, starting from May 2009, and completed by 2013 (or 2015 depending on contract extensions). This was brought forward to December 2011.

Research by London TravelWatch indicated that such a withdrawal could prove costly to TfL. A study conducted in September 2008 found that replacing articulated vehicles on routes 38, 507, and 521, whilst maintaining overall route capacity, would cost an additional £12.6m per annum, due to the additional vehicles necessitated. Additional cost was also incurred with the need to pay early termination fees on leases.

The first articulated vehicles to be replaced were on routes 507 and 521, which were replaced by twelve-metre long single-deck buses in July and September 2009 respectively. Articulated buses were replaced by double-deckers on route 38 in November 2009. Route 207 was the last route to operate articulated buses on 10 December 2011.

Withdrawn buses have found their way to other parts of the UK. Some went to Arriva Midlands in Leicester and Arriva North West in Liverpool. Go-Ahead Group transferred some to its Brighton & Hove, Go North East and Go South Coast divisions. Some were sold to CT Plus, Bristol and McGill's Bus Services, Glasgow. Arriva also exported 81 to Malta in 2011 for use by its Arriva Malta subsidiary.

One articulated vehicle, MAL15 from the Red Arrow batch, has been preserved by the Bromley Bus Preservation Group.

See also

Articulated bus
Articulated buses in the United Kingdom
Buses in London
List of bus types used in London

References

External links

London
Bus transport in London